Progress is a rural locality (a settlement) in Pochepsky District, Bryansk Oblast, Russia. The population was 12 as of 2010. There is 1 street.

Geography 
Progress is located 31 km south of Pochep (the district's administrative centre) by road. Gamaleyevka is the nearest rural locality.

References 

Rural localities in Pochepsky District